Maarten de Niet Gerritzoon (16 March 1904 in Bodegraven – 25 July 1979 in The Hague) was a Dutch politician.

During the Second World War, he was a prisoner in several Japanese prisoner-of-war camps, like Sukamiskin Penitentiary in Bandung.

After the war he became a member of the PvdA and was considered to be very progressive. Between 1950 and 1969 he was mayor of Wageningen. From 1956, he was a member of the Senate as well. As a senator, he often collided with Minister of Foreign Affairs Joseph Luns on the issue of Netherlands New Guinea. In 1969, he replaced Jannes Pieter Mazure as president of the Senate. In 1973 De Niet was succeeded by Theo Thurlings.

Decorations
: Commander of the Order of the Netherlands Lion 
: Officer of the Order of Orange-Nassau

References
  Parlement.com biography

1904 births
1979 deaths
Dutch prisoners of war in World War II
Labour Party (Netherlands) politicians
Mayors of Wageningen
Members of the Senate (Netherlands)
People from Bodegraven
People from Wageningen
People of the Dutch East Indies
Presidents of the Senate (Netherlands)
World War II civilian prisoners held by Japan
Commanders of the Order of the Netherlands Lion
Commanders of the Order of Orange-Nassau